The Coalition Avenir Québec (CAQ) fielded 122 candidates in the 2014 Quebec provincial election and won twenty-two (22) seats to retain their position as the third-largest party in the National Assembly of Quebec.

The party did not field candidates in Saint-Laurent, Soulanges, or Westmount–Saint-Louis.

Source:

References

2014
Lists of Canadian politicians